Salitrillos is a district of the Aserrí canton, in the San José province of Costa Rica.

History 
Salitrillos was created on 22 April 1999 by Decreto 27928-G.

Geography 
Salitrillos has an area of  km² and an elevation of  metres.

Demographics 

For the 2011 census, Salitrillos had a population of  inhabitants.

Transportation

Road transportation 
The district is covered by the following road routes:
 National Route 209
 National Route 304

References 

Districts of San José Province
Populated places in San José Province